MDB may refer to:

Computing
 .mdb, a file-extension used in certain versions of Microsoft Access databases
 MDB, a kernel debugger for the Linux kernel.
 MDB, the NASDAQ ticker symbol for MongoDB, a database management system.
 Message Driven Bean, a special type of Enterprise JavaBean
 Modular Debugger, a debugger available as part of the Solaris Operating System
 Multidrop bus, a category of computer bus

Politics
 Mitglied des Deutschen Bundestages (MdB), a member of the German Parliament
 Brazilian Democratic Movement, a centrist political party in Brazil

Other uses
 Multilateral Development Bank
 Maidstone Barracks railway station, UK National Rail station code
 3,4-methylenedioxybutanphenamine, an entactogenic drug
 Medulloblastoma common type of primary brain cancer in children
 My Dying Bride, a British doom metal band

See also
1MDB, 1Malaysia Development Berhad, Malaysian strategic development company